Massachusetts Senate's 2nd Hampden and Hampshire district in the United States is one of 40 legislative districts of the Massachusetts Senate. It covers 29.3% of Hampden County and 13.8% of Hampshire County population in 2010. Democrat John Velis has represented the district since May 2020.

Towns represented
The district includes the following localities:
 Agawam
 part of Chicopee
 Easthampton
 Granville
 Holyoke
 Montgomery
 Russell
 Southampton
 Southwick
 Tolland
 Westfield

The current district geographic boundary overlaps with those of the Massachusetts House of Representatives' 4th Berkshire, 3rd Hampden, 4th Hampden, 5th Hampden, 8th Hampden, 1st Hampshire, and 2nd Hampshire districts.

Senators 
 Alan D. Sisitsky
 Linda Melconian, circa 1985 
 Michael R. Knapik, circa 2002 
 Donald F. Humason, Jr., November 20, 2013 – January 5, 2020
John Velis, May 28, 2020 – present

Images
Portraits of legislators

See also
 List of Massachusetts Senate elections
 Other Hampden County districts of the Massachusett Senate: Berkshire, Hampshire, Franklin, and Hampden; Hampden; 1st Hampden and Hampshire
 Other Hampshire County districts of the Massachusett Senate: Berkshire, Hampshire, Franklin, and Hampden; 1st Hampden and Hampshire; Hampshire, Franklin and Worcester
 Hampden County districts of the Massachusetts House of Representatives: 1st, 2nd, 3rd, 4th, 5th, 6th, 7th, 8th, 9th, 10th, 11th, 12th
 Hampshire County districts of the Massachusetts House of Representatives: 1st, 2nd, 3rd
 List of Massachusetts General Courts
 List of former districts of the Massachusetts Senate

References

External links
 Ballotpedia
  (State Senate district information based on U.S. Census Bureau's American Community Survey).
 

Senate
Government of Hampden County, Massachusetts
Government of Hampshire County, Massachusetts
Massachusetts Senate